Držkov is a municipality and village in Jablonec nad Nisou District in the Liberec Region of the Czech Republic. It has about 600 inhabitants.

Notable people
Miroslav Havel (1922–2008), glassmaker and designer

References

Villages in Jablonec nad Nisou District